El-Tabia Mosque is a mosque in Aswan, Egypt. The mosque is surrounded by scenic gardens. The El-Tabia Mosque is located amidst a park on a hill in the center of Aswan.

It reveals a typical architecture of central-dome mosques having an arched entrance, flanked in this case by two minarets, and the prayer hall beneath a central dome.

See also
  Lists of mosques 
  List of mosques in Africa
  List of mosques in Egypt
 Islam in Egypt

Mosques in Egypt
Aswan
Buildings and structures in Aswan Governorate
Mosque buildings with domes